Grahovo Brdo is a small settlement east of Križ in the Municipality of Sežana in the Littoral region of Slovenia.

References

External links

Grahovo Brdo on Geopedia

Populated places in the Municipality of Sežana